The 2007 Oceania Women's Handball Champions Cup was held in New Caledonia from the 12 to 15 September, 2007. With 8 teams from 5 countries competing in Noumea for the first edition of the Women's Oceania Champions Cup.

Local teams dominated the tournament with ACB Poya winning from fellow New Caledonia team CS Sinoj. Tahitian sides filled third, AS Dragon, and fourth, Tiare Anani. JS Mont Dore also from New Caledonia was fifth, Monash University from Australia sixth, then Auckland from New Zealand and HB Kafika from Wallis and Futuna.

Final standings

References

 Report on Auckland webpage 
 Photos of tournament 

Oceania Handball Champions Cup
2007 in handball